Yengi Emam (also Romanized as Yengī Emām, Yangī Emām, and Yangi Imām) was a village in Saidabad Rural District, in the Central District of Savojbolagh County, Alborz Province, Iran. At the 2006 census, its population was 5,234, in 1,375 families.

The village was incorporated as a borough into the municipal jurisdiction of Hashtgerd city.

See also
Yengi Emam Caravansari

References 

Populated places in Savojbolagh County